This is a list of diplomatic missions in Panama. There are currently 49 embassies in Panama City.

Diplomatic missions in Panama City

Embassies

Other missions or delegations 
 (Delegation) 
 (Embassy office)
 (Representative office)

Gallery of embassies

Consulates

Colón

David

Jaqué

Puerto Obaldía

Non-resident embassies 
Resident in Bogotá, Colombia

 
 
 
 
 
 
 
 
  
   
 

Resident in Havana, Cuba

 
  
 
 
 
  
 
 
 
 
 
 
 

Resident in Mexico City, Mexico

 
 
  
  
  
  
  
 
 
 
 
  
 
  
 
  
  
 
  
 

Resident in Washington, D.C., United States of America

 
 
  
 
 
 
  
 
 
  
 
 
 
 

Resident in New York City, United States of America

 
 
 
  
  
  
 
 
  
  
  

Resident elsewhere

  (Quito)
  (Guatemala City)
  (Ottawa)
  (Caracas)
  (Brasília)
  (Lima)
  (Rome)
  (Lima)
  (Singapore)
  (Guatemala City)
  (San José)
  (Santiago de Chile)

See also 
 Foreign relations of Panama
 List of diplomatic missions of Panama
 Visa requirements for Panamanian citizens

Notes

References

External links 
 Ministry of Foreign Affairs of Panama (Spanish)

Panama
Diplomatic missions in Panama